Morris Branch is a  long 1st order tributary to Strawberry Creek in Pittsylvania County, Virginia.

Course 
Morris Branch rises about 1 mile north of Whitmell, Virginia and then flows generally north to join Strawberry Creek about 0.5 miles southeast of Banister.

Watershed 
Morris Branch drains  of area, receives about 46.0 in/year of precipitation, has a wetness index of 393.96, and is about 49% forested.

See also 
 List of Virginia Rivers

References 

Rivers of Virginia
Rivers of Pittsylvania County, Virginia
Tributaries of the Roanoke River